Police Python 357 (also known as The Case Against Ferro) is a 1976 French crime-thriller film written and directed by Alain Corneau.  It is an adaptation of the storyline of Kenneth Fearing's 1946 novel, The Big Clock, though with obvious stylistic influences from earlier 70's police thrillers like Dirty Harry (the film's opening sequence directly copies that of Magnum Force).

Cast 
 Yves Montand as Inspector Marc Ferrot
 François Périer as Police Commissioner Ganay
 Simone Signoret as Thérèse Ganay
 Stefania Sandrelli as Sylvia Leopardi
 Mathieu Carrière as Inspector Ménard
 Vadim Glowna as Inspector Abadie
 Claude Bertrand as Merchant of pigs 
 Serge Marquand as "The Red"

References

External links

1976 films
1976 crime films
1970s crime thriller films
1970s French-language films
1970s police films
Films based on American crime novels
Films directed by Alain Corneau
Films scored by Georges Delerue
French crime thriller films
French police films
Police detective films
1970s French films